Outlook was a Canadian current affairs television series which aired on CBC Television in 1960.

Premise
This series featured political topics such as the campaign towards the 1960 United States presidential election, speculation on the Canadian economy and the effects of the press on the political system. Episodes also concerned international situations in Africa, Latin America and the West Indies. Saturday Night editor Arnold Edinborough was host of this interim series between seasons of Fighting Words.

Production
Gordon Babineau produced this series, with assistance from Catherine MacIver.

Scheduling
This half-hour series was broadcast on Sundays at 10:30 p.m. (Eastern) from 3 July to 25 September 1960.

References

External links
 

CBC Television original programming
1960 Canadian television series debuts
1960 Canadian television series endings